Between 17 June 2010 and 19 September 2012, 175 representatives filled the 150 seats of the House of Representatives, the lower house of the States-General of the Netherlands. Gerdi Verbeet was elected Speaker of the House of Representatives for this period.

The members were elected at the general election of 9 June 2010. After the election, the First Rutte cabinet was formed for this term, consisting of People's Party for Freedom and Democracy (VVD, 31 seats) and Christian Democratic Appeal (CDA, 21 seats), supported by Party for Freedom (PVV, 24 seats). The opposition consisted of Labour Party (PvdA, 30 seats), Socialist Party (SP, 15 seats), Democrats 66 (D66, 10 seats), GroenLinks (GL, 10 seats), Christian Union (CU, 5 seats), Reformed Political Party (SGP, 2 seats) and Party for the Animals (PvdD, 2 seats). Hero Brinkman, Marcial Hernandez and Wim Kortenoeven left the PVV and continued as independents, changing the number of seats of the PVV. Jhim van Bemmel also left the PVV on 6 July 2012, but this fell entirely in recess, so never materialised.

Jan Peter Balkenende and Jack de Vries (both CDA) were elected directly, but declined their appointment.

Replacements were supplied from their party lists, so the resignation of individual members did not change the balance of power in the House of Representatives.

Members

Notes

References 

 

2010-2012